The SGI IRIS series of terminals and workstations from Silicon Graphics was produced in the 1980s and 1990s. IRIS is an acronym for Integrated Raster Imaging System.

Overview

68000
The early systems up to IRIS 3000 use the Motorola 68000 series of processors originally, and later models feature early-generation MIPS processors. These systems run the GL2 operating system, a predecessor of the IRIX operating system, which is based on UniSoft UniPlus System V Unix. GL2 uses a proprietary windowing system named mex (Multiple EXposure).

The first model, the IRIS 1000, was shipped around November 1983 with an 8 MHz Motorola 68000 CPU. It is a graphics terminal intended to be attached to a VAX-11 system running either VAX/VMS or BSD Unix. The related IRIS 1200 terminal has a 20-slot backplane in its cabinet versus the 10-slot backplane of the IRIS 1000.

The IRIS 1400 Workstation (also known as the IRIS Workstation) was shipped only in 1984. It has a 10 MHz Motorola 68010.

MIPS

The MIPS based IRIS line includes SGI IRIS 4D, IRIS Indigo, and IRIS Crimson.

The SGI IRIS 4D series was released in the late 1980s through mid 1990s, as the Personal, Professional, and Crimson subseries.  They are the first SGI workstations to use the MIPS architecture.  The line culminated with the Crimson which was produced from 1992 to 1997 with the same case as PowerSeries.

See also
Silicon Graphics Image for filename extension .iris
IRIS GL, the predecessor of OpenGL

External links
IRIS 1000
IRIS 2000
IRIS 3000

References 

68k-based computers
IRIS
Computer-related introductions in 1983
32-bit computers